Pasquotank may refer to:
 Pasquotank County, North Carolina
 Pasquotank River, in northeastern North Carolina